Grevillea decurrens, also known as the clothes-peg tree, is a species of flowering plant in the family Proteaceae and is endemic to northern Australia. It is a shrub or tree with divided leaves, the lobes elliptic to egg-shaped with the narrower end towards the base, and conical groups of pink or cream-coloured flowers.

Description
Flowering occurs from November to March and the fruit is a more or less spherical follicle  in diameter.

Taxonomy
Grevillea decurrens was first formally described in 1917 by Alfred James Ewart in The Flora of the Northern Territory from specimens collected by Walter Scott Campbell in 1911. The specific epithet (decurrens) means "decurrent".

Distribution and habitat
This grevillea grows in open, tropical woodland in the Kimberley region of Western Australia and as far south as Derby, and from TimberCreek to Darwin including Melville Island and east to Arnhem Land in the Northern Territory.

Conservation status
Grevillea decurrens is listed as "not threatened" by the Western Australian Government Department of Parks and Wildlife and of "least concern" in the Northern Territory.

References

decurrens
Proteales of Australia
Flora of the Northern Territory
Eudicots of Western Australia
Plants described in 1917
Taxa named by Alfred James Ewart